The Pacific Oceania Fed Cup team represents the island nations of Oceania in Fed Cup tennis competition and are governed by the Oceania Tennis Federation. In 2015 they took part in Fed Cup competition for the first time in ten years.

Current team
The 2022 Fed Cup roster for Pacific Oceania.
  Patricia Apisah
  Violet Apisah
  Kalani Soli
  Abigail Tere-Apisah

History
Pacific Oceania competed in its first Fed Cup in 1995.  Their best result was reaching Group I in 1999,  2001, and 2019.

Nations represented

Former squad members
Active players listed in bold

See also
Fed Cup
Pacific Oceania Davis Cup team

External links

Billie Jean King Cup teams
Tennis in Oceania